Hotel Silence is a 2016 novel by Auður Ava Ólafsdóttir.

This novel deals with a man in his late 40s, poor, abandoned by his wife and suffering his midlife crisis.

It was awarded the Nordic Council's Literature Prize in 2018.

References 

2016 novels
Icelandic novels
Novels set in Iceland
Novels about midlife crisis